The MAMA Award for Best Female Group is an award presented annually by CJ E&M Pictures (Mnet). It was first awarded at the 2nd Mnet Asian Music Awards ceremony held in 2000, although two female groups were included in the nominees for the Best Male Group in 1999; the band Fin.K.L won the award for their song "Now", and it is given in honor for the female group with the most artistic achievement in the music industry.

Winners and nominees

2000s

2010s

2020s

Multiple awards
4 wins
 Twice

3 wins
 Girls' Generation

2 wins
 Sistar
 Jewelry
 S.E.S.
 Blackpink

See also
 List of music awards honoring women

Notes

External links
 Mnet Asian Music Awards official website

MAMA Awards
Music awards honoring women